The 7th constituency of Moselle is a French legislative constituency in the Moselle département.

Description

Moselle's 7th constituency is formed around the town of Saint-Avold on the German border.

The domination of conservative candidates was broken in the 2012 elections after a National Front candidate secured a place in the second round thus splitting the conservative vote and allowing the election of the Socialist candidate.

Historic Representation

Election results

2022

2017

2012

 
 
 
 
|-
| colspan="8" bgcolor="#E9E9E9"|
|-

Sources
Official results of French elections from 2002: "Résultats électoraux officiels en France" (in French).

7